Justice Hand or Judge Hand may refer to:

Augustus C. Hand (1803–1878), justice of the New York Supreme Court, and ex officio a judge of the New York Court of Appeals
Augustus Noble Hand (1869–1954), judge on the United States District Court for the Southern District of New York and the United States Court of Appeals for the Second Circuit
John P. Hand (1850–1923), chief justice of the Supreme Court of Illinois
Learned Hand (1872–1961), judge on the United States District Court for the Southern District of New York and the United States Court of Appeals for the Second Circuit
Samuel Hand (1834–1886), associate judge of the New York Court of Appeals
William Brevard Hand (1924–2008), judge of the United States District Court for the Southern District of Alabama